Garden Park is a paleontological site in Fremont County, Colorado, known for its Jurassic dinosaurs and the role the specimens played in the infamous Bone Wars of the late 19th century. Garden Park proper is a triangular valley surrounded by cliffs on the southeast and southwest and by mountains to the north; however, the name is also refers to the dinosaur sites on top and along the cliffs. The dinosaur sites now form the Garden Park Paleontological Resource Area, which is overseen by the Bureau of Land Management.

Geology 

Garden Park was formed by erosion of sedimentary rocks that have been distorted by uplift of the Rocky Mountains. The region is bisected by Four Mile Creek (also called Oil Creek), which has carved a canyon through the Mesozoic and Paleozoic sedimentary rocks. One of these Mesozoic strata is the Morrison Formation, which is exposed within the canyon. However, because the formation contains high amounts of swelling clays, large faulted blocks or slump-blocks of the formation are slowly moving towards the creek. The result is to make it difficult to correlate the various dinosaur quarries because exposures are limited and not continuous.

The formation in Garden Park can be divided informally into a lower and upper unit. The lower unit is composed primarily green and gray mudstones, with numerous lenticular, white to tan to gray sandstones. The upper is composed mostly of red mudstone, with lesser amounts of yellowish, often tabular sandstone. These two units probably correspond to the Tidwell, Saltwash and Brushy Basin members of the Morrison Formation on the Colorado Plateau.

Dinosaurs 

The discovery of dinosaurs in the Garden Park area has been presented numerous times by Schuchert and LeVene, Shur, Ostrom and McIntosh, and Jaffe. Othniel Charles Marsh and Edward Drinker Cope both produced major finds here.  The lesser known post-Marsh and Cope collecting of dinosaurs has been presented by Monaco. She recounts the  expeditions by the Carnegie Museum of Natural History in the early 20th century, the Denver Museum of Natural History in the 1930 and 1990s, and the Cleveland Museum of Natural History in the mid-1950s.

Dinosaurs from Garden Park on display include Allosaurus fragilis, Diplodocus longus, Ceratosaurus nasicornis, and Stegosaurus stenops at the National Museum of Natural History, Haplocanthosaurus delfsi at the Cleveland Museum of Natural History, and Othnielosaurus consors (then called Othnielia rex), Stegosaurus stenops and a clutch of Preprismatoolithus coloradensis eggs at the Denver Museum of Nature and Science.

Major vertebrate quarries
references  (h) = holotype

References

External links
Garden Park Fossil Area - Bureau of Land Management
Hands On The Land

Jurassic Colorado
Jurassic paleontological sites of North America
Morrison Formation
Paleontology in Colorado
Protected areas of Fremont County, Colorado
Bureau of Land Management areas in Colorado